Richard James Roberts (born August 31, 1949) is an American country rock and soft rock singer-songwriter who recorded with many influential artists over several genres. He is best known as a founding member and lead singer of Firefall from 1974 to 1981, as well as his work with The Flying Burrito Brothers on their 1971 self-titled album. He also recorded two solo albums, Windmills in 1972 and She Is a Song in 1973.

Career

In the fall of 1981, Roberts played dates in tandem with fellow former Burrito Brother Chris Hillman. 
  
In 1985, he was a member of "A 20th Anniversary Tribute to The Byrds", a band co-founded by ex-Byrds Gene Clark and Michael Clarke. The group also originally included former members of The Band, Richard Manuel and Rick Danko, as well as Blondie Chaplin and John York (who was Chris Hillman's replacement in The Byrds in 1968). The band generated controversy through public confusion in relation to the original Byrds, at times being billed at some venues as "The Byrds".

In 1987, he teamed up with ex-Eagle Randy Meisner in the short lived Roberts-Meisner Band and then rejoined his bandmates in Firefall from 1989 to 1992. But he was sidelined due to health issues for a number of years before eventually returning to the road as a solo act. In 2010 he returned to music and released three 4-song-EPs on iTunes - 'Phases'; 'Same Mirror, Different Images' and 'Full Bloom' (the latter having two different track listings) - and launched his website and in the summer and fall of 2019, he toured together with fellow Firefaller Larry Burnett.

Discography

Solo albums
 1972: Windmills (A&M)
 1973: She Is a Song (A&M)

Singles
 1972: "Deliver Me (Mono)" / "Deliver Me (Stereo)" (A&M)

Compilations
 1979: The Best of Rick Roberts (A&M)
 2009: Windmills / She Is a Song (BGO) – UK release

As a member of The Flying Burrito Brothers
 1971: The Flying Burrito Bros (A&M)
 1971: Devils in Disguise: 1971 Live Radio Broadcast (Smokin' / Let Them Eat Vinyl) – released in 2012
 1972: Last of the Red Hot Burritos (A&M)
 1973: Live in Amsterdam (Ariola)

As a member of Firefall
 1976: Firefall (Atlantic)
 1977: Luna Sea (Atlantic)
 1978: Élan (Atlantic)
 1978: Undertow (Atlantic)
 1980: Clouds Across the Sun (Atlantic)

As composer
 1973: Linda Ronstadt – Don't Cry Now (Asylum) – track 7, "Colorado"
 1977, Chris Hillman – Clear Sailin''' (Asylum) – track 10, "Clear Sailin'" (co-written with Chris Hillman and Richard Marx)
 1977: New Grass Revival – When the Storm Is Over (Flying Fish) – track 1, "Four Days Of Rain"
 1978: The Dirt Band – The Dirt Band (United Artists) – track 4, "Lights"
 1979: The Dirt Band – An American Dream (United Artists) – track 2, "In Her Eyes"
 1979: McGuinn, Clark & Hillman – McGuinn, Clark & Hillman (Capitol) – track 1, "Long Long Time" (co-written with Chris Hillman)
 1996: Barry Manilow – Summer of '78 (Arista) – track 12, "Just Remember I Love You"
 2000: Jill Jack – Watch Over Me (Drum Dancer)- track 10, "Colorado"
 2002: Beki Hemingway – Words for Loss for Words (Salt Lady) – track 8, "Just Remember I Love You"
 2004: Curtis Burch – Burchland (Bowling Green Chamber) – track 5, "Four Days of Rain"
 2008: Shawna Russell – Goddess (Way Out West) – track 5, "Strange Way"
 2009: John Cowan – Telluride Live (Entertainment One) – track 6, "Four Days of Rain"
 2014: John Cowan – Sixty (Compass) – track 2, "Why Are You Crying"

Also appears on
 1970: Bob Gibson – Bob Gibson (Capitol) – vocals
 1975: Stephen Stills – Stills (Columbia) – vocals
 1976: Robbin Thompson – Robbin Thompson (Nemperor) – backing vocals
 1976: Chris Hillman – Slippin' Away (Asylum) – vocals 
 1977: Wild Oats – Wild Oats (Clouds) – vocals
 1980: Robbin Thompson – (Two "b's" Please)'' (Ovation) – backing vocals

Bibliography

References

External links 
 
 
 
 KDRT-LP radio interview July 2017

1949 births
Living people
American rock singers
Singers from Florida
The Flying Burrito Brothers members
Firefall members